The dark green fritillary (Speyeria aglaja) is a species of butterfly in the family Nymphalidae. The insect has a wide range in the Palearctic realm - Europe, Morocco, Iran, Siberia, Central Asia, China, Korea, and Japan.

Description in Seitz
The large fritillary is fiery reddish yellow above, the basal area of the male being always duller. The markings are constant: a black margin, a row of deep black but thin marginal arcs, a very straight, central row of dots, of which only the last one of the forewing is shifted distad; between this row of dots and the base there are six thin black transverse bands extending from the subcostal vein into the wing. The underside of the hindwing is characteristic; it bears numerous silver-spots on a partly verdigris partly leather-yellow ground, but never a row of ocelli in the marginal area, as is the case in the forms of the Niobe fritillary (Fabriciana niobe) and high brown fritillary (F. adippe).

Subspecies
S. a. aglaja Southern Europe, Central Europe, Caucasus, Altai, Sayan, West Siberia, South Siberia
S. a. borealis (Strand, 1901) Europe, Siberia, Russian Far East, Kamchatka
S. a. lyauteyi (Oberthür, 1920) Morocco (Middle Atlas)
S. a. excelsior (Rothschild, 1933) Morocco (Rif Mountains)
S. a. ottomana (Röber, 1896) Armenia, Talys, Kopet Dagh
S. a. gigasvitatha (Verity, 1935) Tian-Shan, Ghissar, Darvaz, Alai, South Altai
S. a. vitatha (Moore, 1874) Pamirs
S. a. clavimacula (Matsumura, 1929) South Ussuri
S. a. kenteana (Stichel, 1901) Transbaikalia, North Ussuri, Amur
S. a. tonnai (Matsumura, 1928) Sakhalin
S. a. bessa (Fruhstorfer, 1907) ?

United Kingdom
In the U.K. the habitat is often pastures and flowery banks, and nearby areas where the preferred food plants for the larvae, Viola canina and Viola riviniana, grow.

The dark green fritillary uses violets within bracken mosaics frequently consisting of one-third bracken and two-thirds grass, often on the edges of suitable high brown fritillary habitat. Their distribution can be found on the NBN website.

References 

Emmet, A.M., J. Heath et al. (Ed.), 1990. The Butterflies of Great Britain and Ireland. The Moths and Butterflies of Great Britain and Ireland Vol. 7 Part 1 (Hesperiidae to Nymphalidae). Harley Books, Colchester, UK. 370p.
Tomlinson, D. and R. Still, 2002. Britain's Butterflies. WildGuides, Old Basing, UK. 192p.
 Bracken for Butterflies Leaflet by Butterfly Conservation
Crory, Andrew. 2016. Fritillary Butterflies. The Irish Hare. Ulster Wildlife Membership Magazine. Issue 113 p. 4

Speyeria
Butterflies of Africa
Butterflies of Asia
Butterflies of Europe
Butterflies described in 1758
Taxa named by Carl Linnaeus